Rolando Hugo Irusta (born 27 March 1938) is an Argentine football goalkeeper who played for Argentina in the 1966 FIFA World Cup. He also played for Club Atlético Lanús and Excursionistas

References

External links
FIFA profile

1938 births
Argentine footballers
Argentina international footballers
Association football goalkeepers
Club Atlético Lanús footballers
1966 FIFA World Cup players
Living people
Footballers from Córdoba, Argentina